Justice Glassman may refer to:

Caroline Duby Glassman, associate justice of the Maine Supreme Judicial Court 
Harry P. Glassman, associate justice of the Maine Supreme Judicial Court